The Rossland Range is a subrange of the Monashee Mountains of the Columbia Mountains, between the Columbia River and Big Sheep Creek in British Columbia, Canada. The highest point in the range is Old Glory Mountain, .

See also

 Geography of British Columbia
 Geology of British Columbia

References

Rossland Range in the Canadian Mountain Encyclopedia

Monashee Mountains